Darsheel Safary (born 9 March 1997) is an Indian actor who appears in Hindi films and television. Safary made his film debut with the leading role of a dyslexic student in Aamir Khan's directorial debut, the critically acclaimed drama Taare Zameen Par (2007), for which he won the Filmfare critic's Award for Best Actor.

Career
In 2007, Safary made his acting debut in Taare Zameen Par, playing the film's protagonist Ishaan Nandkishore Awasthi. Safary was discovered by script writer and creative director, Amol Gupte in late 2006 when he was looking for a male lead for Taare Zameen Par. After going through hundreds of auditions, Gupte found Safary at Shiamak Davar's dancing school, "Summer Funk". In choosing Safary, Gupte had a number of boys audition for a scene in which they would informally describe how they would "bunk" school after being given a few scenarios. He recalls, "It was a tough call. But Darsheel has the mischief in his eyes to be Ishaan. Everyone just naturally gravitated towards him."

Safary's performance as a struggling dyslexic child was praised by film critics. He won several awards for his performance. Taran Adarsh from indiaFM wrote, "Taare Zameen Par belongs to Master Darsheel Safary. A performance that makes the best of performances pale in comparison. A performance that deserves brownie points. A performance that'll always come first on your mind the moment someone mentions Taare Zameen Par. A performance that's impeccable, flawless and astounding. A performance that moves you and makes you reflect on your growing years. A performance that merits a special award!" Rajeev Masand of CNN-IBN wrote, "Darsheel Safary steals your heart as Ishaan Awasthi. Darsheel is a revelation as an actor, he's spontaneous and lovable and carries this film completely on his shoulders". Other reviewers called Safary the "real star of the film" and his performance as "brilliant". In a 2007 interview, Safary stated that his career plans may include singing, dancing, becoming a businessman or jewellery designer.

His second film Bumm Bumm Bole came in 2010 and according to some sources he was paid ₹ 3 lakh, highest amount paid to any child actor. After that he did two more films, Disney India's superhero film Zokkomon (2011) and Deepa Mehta's Midnight's Children (2012).

In 2012, he participated in dance reality show Jhalak Dikhhla Jaa with Avneet Kaur as his dance partner, but was eliminated and came in seventh position. In 2016, he played the role of Abhay in anthology series Yeh Hai Aashiqui.

Filmography

Films

Television

Web series

Music videos

Awards

References

External links

Indian male film actors
Indian male child actors
21st-century Indian male child actors
Living people
1997 births
Filmfare Awards winners
Zee Cine Awards winners